Chain Home Low (CHL) was the name of a British early warning radar system operated by the RAF during World War II. The name refers to CHL's ability to detect aircraft flying at altitudes below the capabilities of the original Chain Home (CH) radars, where most CHL radars were co-located. The official name was  AMES Type 2, referring to the Air Ministry Experimental Station at Bawdsey Manor where it was developed, but this name was almost never used in practice.

The system had originally been developed by the British Army's research group, also based at Bawdsey, as a system for detecting enemy shipping in the English Channel. It was built using the electronics being developed for the Airborne Interception radar systems, which worked on the 1.5 m band. This high-frequency (200 MHz), for the era, allowed it to use smaller antennas that could be swung back and forth to look for returns, in contrast to the enormous fixed antennas of the 6.7 m wavelength (45 MHz) Chain Home system.

When the war began, the Luftwaffe began mine-laying missions where the bomber aircraft would fly almost all of their mission at low altitude. Chain Home could only see targets above 1.5 degrees over the horizon, so these aircraft only became visible at short range. Robert Watson Watt seized several dozen of the CD systems that were in final construction and installed them at CH stations and key locations along the seashore to fill this critical gap in the coverage.

CHL remained an important part of the Chain network for the rest of the war, and was retained in the post-war era until it was replaced during the ROTOR upgrades by the AMES Type 80. The electronics, notably the high-power transmitter, was also re-used in a number of other systems, including the AMES Type 7.

Development

Accidental discovery
CHL traces its origins to early experiments with Airborne Interception radar systems in 1936. Developed by a team at Bawdsey Manor led by "Taffy" Bowen, the new radar had to operate at much shorter wavelengths in order to limit the antenna sizes to something that could be practically fit on an aeroplane. After considerable experimentation, the team settled on a set working at 1.5 meter wavelength, about 193 MHz in the VHF band.

In early experiments with the new set, the team found that detection of other aircraft was problematic due to their target's relatively small size, but especially due to reflections off the ground. The latter caused a very strong signal that appeared to be at a range equal to the aircraft's current altitude, and everything beyond that was invisible in the resulting clutter.

These same experiments demonstrated an unexpected side-effect. As the aircraft flew around over Bawdsey, which is located on the coast of the English Channel, the team found strong constant returns that they later realised were the cranes at the Harwich docks, miles away. Other smaller returns were quickly identified as boats in the Channel. These were being detected at ranges far beyond the maximum range against aircraft, in spite of the antennas not being designed for this role.

The potential of this discovery was not lost, and Robert Watson-Watt asked the team to demonstrate the concept in a real-world setting. A series of military exercises in the Channel in September 1937 provided a perfect test. On 3 September the team's test aircraft, Avro Anson K6260, detected several Royal Navy ships in the Channel, and the next day repeated this performance in spite of almost complete overcast. Albert Percival Rowe of the Tizard Committee later commented that "This, had they known, was the writing on the wall for the German Submarine Service."

CD
The British Army was actually the first to consider radar, when W. A. S. Butement and P. E. Pollard submitted a paper in 1931 suggesting using pulses of radio signal to measure the distance to ships. The Army was uninterested until they heard about Watt's work at Bawdsey, when they suddenly became very interested. In October 1936 a liaison team led by E. T. Paris and Albert Beaumont Wood was set up at Bawdsey, officially known as the Military Applications Section, but universally referred to as the "Army Cell".

Ironically, the only two technicians with the required experience available were Butement and Pollard. The two quickly began development of two projects, the Mobile Radar Unit (MRU) which was a mobile version of Chain Home, and Gun Laying radar, a much smaller unit designed to provide range measurements against aircraft as an aid to aiming their anti-aircraft artillery. Both operated at the longer wavelengths typical of the RAF radars of the era, which led to them being relatively large. The teams had made considerable progress on both projects by the summer of 1937, with Gun Laying radar, Mk. I (GL) about to enter initial production, and the MRUs later taken over in 1938 by the RAF as the AMES Type 9.

With this work starting to move from development to production, coincident with Bowen's astonishing anti-shipping demonstration, Butement began looking for ways to adapt Bowen's 1.5 m set for new roles. They revisited their original concept to develop Coast Defence radar (CD), allowing the Army's coastal artillery to aim their guns at night or in fog. The CD set was in most respects a version of the GL working at the shorter 1.5 m wavelength, and like GL, used separate transmit and receive antennas that had to be rotated together to be aimed at a target. The earlier GL system operated at just over 6 m, which meant the antenna was very large. The GL array had only four horizontal elements in it, which offered resolution on the order of 20 degrees. This allowed the operator to pick out a single aircraft as long as they weren't in formation, but could not be used to directly guide the guns. In contrast, the 1.5 m wavelength of the new sets allowed an antenna of about the same size to feature eight dipoles, reducing the angle to about 1.5 degrees.

Although this was of marginal capability in terms of directly aiming the guns, in July 1939 it was noticed that when the Army's 9.2-inch guns missed their targets, the splash of water caused by the shell would cause a brief but obvious return on the radar sets. This meant that any inaccuracy in the radar antenna's measurements could be eliminated by comparing the target and the splashes on the screen, as these would both have exactly the same error. The gunners could then correct their fire ("walk") onto the targets in the same fashion that they would when being given corrections by remote observers.

CD becomes CHL

During early tests against Chain Home in 1938, RAF pilots had noticed they could escape detection by flying at low altitudes. This was due to the minimum angle of the CH being about 1.5 degrees above the horizon, which meant aircraft were below the radar's sight until they approached within a few miles. At first this was not considered to be a serious limitation, as bombers typically flew at altitudes of 15,000 feet or greater, and at that altitude they could be detected over France.

But as the magnitude of the problem became clear, Watt became concerned. These differed from the CD sets primarily in the antenna: instead of a single horizontal array, CHL used four stacked arrays of five dipoles, reducing the azimuth accuracy but allowing altitude to be estimated by comparing the returns from the different sets of vertical arrays. In keeping with its rapid introduction, CHL was a relatively simple manually-directed system that required the operator to hunt for targets by swinging the antenna back and forth looking for returns. The antenna was originally powered by WAAFs mounted on wheel-less bicycles whose chains were connected to a gear system.

It was not long after the start of the war that the Germans accidentally noticed the effect when flying low. In this case, aircraft sent on minelaying sorties almost always returned while those on other intruder missions were almost always intercepted. These aircraft had to drop their payloads from very low altitudes, so they generally followed routes over water, including rivers, flying at low altitudes for most of the mission. At first, it was not obvious why they were surviving, as there could be many reasons; fighters might not be able to see them against the ground, AA guns positioned inland might not be able to aim at them, etc. But it quickly became apparent that low altitude flight meant they were not being detected on the radars.

The Luftwaffe soon began a series of low-level attacks that proved almost impossible to defend against. Additional CHL sets were ordered and set up to fill the gaps between the sets co-located at the CH stations. In April 1941 all of the CHL sets were upgraded with a new antenna that was motorized to spin at 1, 1.5, 2 or 3.33 rpm, and used a single transmit/receive antenna instead of separate ones.

CHL and GCI
When first deployed, CHL was used both for early detection of low-level targets, as well as a system for tracking individual aircraft over land; unlike CH which was permanently facing over water, CHL could be turned to look in any direction. This latter role became outdated with the introduction of the AMES Type 7 in 1942. Electronically, the Type 7 was essentially a larger and more powerful version of the CHL, with a larger ground-level antenna. However, the antenna was continuously spun through a complete circle, and returns were plotted in a map-like form known as a plan-position indicator (PPI). Whereas CHL operators had to calculate a single target's position from the range and bearing, Type 7 operators saw all of the aircraft in their area simultaneously and could determine their map location directly. CHL was increasingly used purely for early warning, calling in the rough location of targets to Type 7 stations who would then know where to look.

Several adaptations of the CHL were made during the war. Such systems could be mobile  in which units were placed on trucks for movement  matching the enemy's, extending the RAF's options in engaging the enemy.

AMES Type 11
Although GCI began to supplant CHL during 1941 and especially 1942, CHL continued to provide an important early warning role. In February 1942 the Germans mounted the Channel Dash, moving two of their battleships to harbours in Germany by sailing them right up the English Channel. This major embarrassment was due largely to supremely effective jamming on the part of the Germans, who managed to render the CH and CHL radars covering the coast entirely ineffective without the operators even noticing.

To address this, the RAF began development of the AMES Type 11, a truck-mounted CHL system operating at 500–600 MHz. This frequency was chosen to match that of German anti-aircraft radars, in the hopes that the signals would be more difficult to notice, and that jamming would have negative effects on the German's own radars. Type 11's were deliberately used only in times of jamming in order to avoid giving the Germans signals intelligence about them, and in the end were little used.

List of Chain Home Low sites

See also
 Chain Home
 Air Ministry Experimental Station
 ROTOR
 Linesman/Mediator

Notes

References
  
 
  The history of ground radar in the UK during World War II.
 
  A history of radar in the UK during World War II told by the men and women who worked on it.

External links
Early radar development in the UK

World War II sites in the United Kingdom
Battle of Britain
Ground radars
World War II British electronics
World War II radars
Military radars of the United Kingdom
Air defence radar networks
Military equipment introduced in the 1930s